Sheu Tian-ming  is currently the dean of the College of Education at National Taiwan Normal University, NTNU, and the professor in the Department of Education and the Graduate Institute of Educational Policy and Administration, NTNU. His fields of interest include school finance, education policy analysis, education reform, and indigenous education.

Sheu graduated from the Department of Chinese Literature at National Taiwan University as a bachelor in 1983. With hopes to maximize his influence on society, he decided to step into the realm of education. Sheu later received his M. Ed. from the Department of Educational Administration (now the Department of Educational Leadership and Policy) at University of Utah in 1989, and subsequently  his Ed.D. from the Department of Educational Administration (now the Department of Organization and Leadership), Teachers College at Columbia University.

Speaking of the students at NTNU, Sheu once pointed out an interesting scene. Sheu has graduated from the Department of Chinese Literature at National Taiwan University and is now teaching at NTNU, while his wife, a graduate from the Department of English at NTNU, is now teaching at NTU. Almost every month there would be former students return to the campus to visit him, sometimes with small presents. However, his wife at NTU seldom sees former students return for a visit. “That’s the gratitude of an NTNU graduate,” said Sheu.

Education
1989 – 1993	Dept. of Educational Administration, Teachers College, Columbia University Ed.D. 
1987 – 1989	Dept. of Educational Administration, University of Utah M.Ed.
1979 – 1983	Dept. of Chinese Literature, National Taiwan University B.A.

Employment history
2013 – Present	Dean, School of Education, National Taiwan Normal University
2010 – 2013	Chair, Department of Education; Director, Graduate Institute of Educational Policy and Administration; Director, Graduate Institute of Curriculum & Instruction; Director, Center for Educational Research and Evaluation, National Taiwan Normal University 
2011 – 2012	President, Chinese Education Association 
2006 – Present	Professor, Dept. of Education & Graduate Institute of Educational Policy and Administration, National Taiwan Normal University
2005	Visiting Scholar, Teachers College, Columbia University
2005 – 2006	Director, Graduate Institute of Education & Graduate Institute of Multicultural Education, National Hualien University of Education
2002 – 2006	Professor, Graduate Institute of Education, National Hualien Teachers College 
1999 – 2008	Trustee, Hualien Community College
1995 – 1998	Director, Graduate Institute of Education, National Hualien Teachers College
1994 – 2002	Associate Professor, Graduate Institute of Education National Hualien Teachers College 
1991 – 1994	Chief Editor, New Wave—Educational Research and Development, Cultural Division, TECO in New York.
1989 – 1991	Research Associate, Dept. of Educational Administration, Teachers College, Columbia U.

References

Living people
Year of birth missing (living people)
Taiwanese educational theorists
Academic staff of the National Taiwan Normal University